Vine Street is a street in Hollywood, Los Angeles, California that runs north–south between Franklin Avenue and Melrose Avenue. The intersection with Hollywood Boulevard was once a symbol of Hollywood itself. The famed intersection fell into disrepair during the 1970s but has since begun gentrification and renewal with several high valued projects currently in progress. Three blocks of the Hollywood Walk of Fame lie along this street with names such as John Lennon, Johnny Carson, and Audrey Hepburn. South of Melrose Avenue, Vine turns into Rossmore Avenue, a residential Hancock Park thoroughfare that ends at Wilshire Boulevard.

Radio Row
In contrast to other American cities, where it referred to a concentration of radio stores, in Los Angeles, Radio Row was understood in the 1940s and 1950s as the area around the intersection of Sunset Boulevard and Vine Street in Hollywood, where the broadcasting facilities of all four major radio networks were located. The last radio station to broadcast from a studio on Vine Street, KNX-AM, closed its Vine Street studio in 2005.

Buildings

The California Laundry was located on the street in 1920s. The Capitol Records Building, Capitol Tower, is located just north of the intersection of Hollywood & Vine. Miss Brewster's Millions (1926) starring Bebe Daniels, was shot on Vine Street at Franklin Avenue, near the site what is now the Capitol Records Building. An underground station for the Metro B Line is located one block east at Hollywood Boulevard and Argyle Avenue. Metro Local line 210 serves Vine Street and Rossmore Avenue.

References

External links

Streets in Hollywood, Los Angeles
Streets in Los Angeles